Josef Aschbacher (born 1962) is an Austrian space researcher and manager based in Paris, France. On 1 March 2021, he became the Director General of the European Space Agency (ESA). He previously served as ESA's Director of Earth Observation Programmes from 2016 to 2021.

Education and career
Born in Ellmau, Austria, Josef Aschbacher studied at the University of Innsbruck, graduating with a Master’s degree and a PhD in natural sciences. He has had an accomplished international career in space, combining more than 35 years’ work experience at ESA, the European Commission, the Austrian Space Agency, the Asian Institute of Technology and the University of Innsbruck. He started his career as a Research Scientist at the University's Institute of Meteorology and Geophysics between 1985 and 1989. After, he worked in ESA as a Young Graduate Trainee and also in the European Commission Joint Research Centre. He returned to ESA in 2001 to work as Programme Coordinator for the Copernicus Programme. In 2006, he was appointed Head of the Copernicus Space Office. In 2016, he was appointed ESA Director of Earth Observation Programmes, leading the largest ESA Directorate with an annual budget responsibility of €1.5 billion.  Aschbacher became the ESA Director General on 1 March 2021.

Institutional positions
As Chief Executive Officer of ESA, Dr Aschbacher is responsible for the definition, implementation and development of Europe’s space infrastructure and activities, which include launchers, satellites performing Earth observation, navigation, telecommunication and space science, together with robotic exploration and ESA astronauts working on the International Space Station. He is responsible for an annual budget of €7 billion and a workforce of 5500 distributed across several establishments, principally in Europe.

When taking up office as ESA Director General, Dr Aschbacher published a new strategy for space in Europe, called 'Agenda 2025', aimed at accelerating significantly the use of space in Europe through major new initiatives and programmes.

From 2016–21, he was ESA Director for Earth Observation Programmes and Head of ESA’s ESRIN establishment in Frascati, Italy. He has been a key leader of the European Copernicus programme, which has grown beyond all expectations and is now considered to be one of the most ambitious and successful Earth observation programmes in the world.

He worked in various functions within ESA from 2001 onwards both in Paris and Frascati, Italy. From 1994–2000, he worked at the European Commission’s Joint Research Centre, in his latest position serving as Scientific Assistant to the Director of the Space Applications Institute. From 1991–93 he was stationed as ESA Representative in Southeast Asia, where he developed projects in the Asian region while, at the same time, working in a full-time academic teaching capacity as Associate Professor at AIT Bangkok.

After having been Director of Earth Observation Programmes and head of ESA's ESRIN site in Frascati, Italy, he replaced Jan Wörner as Director General of ESA on 1 March 2021.

He is the former head of Programme Planning & Coordination, ESA Directorate of Earth Observation Programmes, the former head of Copernicus (GMES) Space Office, ESA Directorate of Earth Observation Programmes, and former head of the Programme Coordinator Directorate of Earth Observation Programmes, ESA Paris.

He was a Young Graduate Trainee, ESA ESRIN: Directorate of Earth Observation Programmes, 1990, ESA ESRIN.

Honors
Josef Aschbacher was nominated for Austrian of the Year for Contributions in Science, 2020  and is an honorary member of the European Academy of Science and Arts. In 2021, Aschbacher became 'Grande Ufficiale Ordine al Merito della Repubblica Italiana', the highest recognition accorded to non-Italian nationals. In 2022, he was awarded the Ehrenzeichen des Landes Tirol.

References

External links
 
 
 Josef Aschbacher LinkedIn

1962 births
Living people
University of Innsbruck alumni
21st-century Austrian astronomers
European Space Agency personnel
Austrian expatriates in Italy